'K. Bharathi' also known as 'Marumalarchi K. Bharathi' is an Indian film director, actor who has directed village based stories.  He made his directorial debut with the Mammootty-starrer with his caste Film Maru Malarchi.

Career
Bharathi made his directorial debut with Maru Malarchi starring Mammootty in the lead. The film received critical acclaim, won Tamil Nadu State Film Award for Best Film and also earned Bharathi an award of Best dialogue writer. Bharathi's next directorial Kallazhagar starring Vijayakanth was also a success movie. An elephant called Appu was brought in from Thrissur in Kerala for the film, where the elephant formed one of a stable maintained by the famed Paaramekaavu temple, which forms the venue of the yearly Thrissur Pooram festival. The film was rejected by Indian censors, because of its potential to spark religious conflicts - with particularly a scene in which some Muslim extremists masquerade themselves as religious Hindus and join in the celebration of a major festival in a temple - being highlighted as a concern. The team subsequently had to adapt the concept partially. Bharathi's third film Maanasthan starring Sarathkumar was a delayed project and received mixed reviews. After a four-year gap, Bharathi directed Valluvan Vasuki starring newcomers, the story is about the Konar dynasty and much of the shooting was done in villages bordering the Kollidam River in Thanjavur district. The film received mixed reviews.

In 2020, he announced Marumalarchi 2, a sequel to his earlier film.

Filmography

As director, writer and actor

References

Film directors from Tamil Nadu
Tamil film directors
20th-century Indian film directors
21st-century Indian film directors
Living people
Year of birth missing (living people)